Kaanoon Ki Awaaz  is a 1989 Bollywood film directed by R. Kumar and starring Shatrughan Sinha, Jaya Prada in lead roles.

Cast 
 Shatrughan Sinha as Raghunath Prasad Rai
 Jaya Prada as Advocate / Judge Janki Rai
 Prem Chopra as Darshan Lal
 Aruna Irani as Havaldar Mrs. Banarasi
 Asrani as Havaldar Bhoja Banarasi
 Shekhar Suman
 Menaka Babbar as Advocate Reshmi Mishra
 Bob Christo

Soundtrack

External links

1989 films
1980s Hindi-language films
Films scored by Jagjit Singh